Commercial Street Historic District may refer to:
 Commercial Street Historic District (Springfield, Missouri), listed on the NRHP in Missouri
 Commercial Street Historic District (Mingo Junction, Ohio), listed on the NRHP in Ohio

See also
Commercial Historic District (disambiguation)